Manchester was a Parliamentary borough constituency in the county of Lancashire which was represented in the House of Commons of the Parliament of the United Kingdom. Its territory consisted of the city of Manchester.

History 
Manchester had first been represented in Parliament in 1654, when it was granted one seat in the First Protectorate Parliament. However, as with other boroughs enfranchised during the Commonwealth, it was disenfranchised at the Restoration of the monarchy in 1660.

The subsequent growth of Manchester into a major industrial city left its lack of representation a major anomaly, and demands for a seat in Parliament led to a mass public meeting in August 1819. This peaceful rally of 60,000 pro-democracy reformers, men, women and children, was attacked by armed cavalry resulting in 15 deaths and over 600 injuries, and became known as the Peterloo Massacre.

Reform was attempted unsuccessfully by Lord John Russell, whose bills in 1828 and 1830 were rejected by the Commons. The city was finally enfranchised by the Reform Act of 1832, and at the 1832 general election, Manchester returned two Members of Parliament (MPs). The Reform Act 1867 increased this in 1868 to three Members of Parliament.

Under the Redistribution of Seats Act 1885, the constituency was abolished with effect from the 1885 general election, when the city was split into six new single-member divisions: East, North, North East, North West, South, and South West.

Members of Parliament

MPs 1654–1660

MPs 1832–1885

Elections

Elections in the 1880s

 Caused by Birley's death.

Elections in the 1870s

 Caused by Callender's death.

Elections in the 1860s

 

 

 Seat increased to three members.

 James' death caused a by-election. Bright was an advanced Liberal, and Henry was a Whig liberal.

Elections in the 1850s

 Caused by Potter's death.

Elections in the 1840s

 Caused by Gibson's appointment as Vice-President of the Board of Trade

Elections in the 1830s

 Caused by Poulett-Thomson's resignation after being appointed Governor-General of Canada

 Caused by Poulett-Thomson's appointment as President of the Board of Trade

Sources
Manchester City Council Archive

References 

Parliamentary constituencies in North West England (historic)
Parliamentary constituencies in Manchester (historic)
Constituencies of the Parliament of the United Kingdom established in 1832
Constituencies of the Parliament of the United Kingdom disestablished in 1885
Constituencies of the Parliament of the United Kingdom established in 1654